The High Powered Rifle is a 1960 American action film produced and directed by Maury Dexter and written by Joseph Fritz. The film stars Willard Parker, Allison Hayes, Dan Simmons, John Holland, Shirley O'Hara and Terrea Lea. The film was released in September 1960, by 20th Century Fox.

It was also known as Duel in the City.

Plot
A private eye is attacked by an assassin.

Cast 
Willard Parker as Stephen Dancer
Allison Hayes as Sharon Hill
Dan Simmons as Lt. Sam 'Mac' Donald
John Holland as District Attorney
Shirley O'Hara as Jean Brewster
Terrea Lea as Terrea Lea
Leonard P. Geer as Gus Alpert
Clark Howat as George Merkle
A.G. Vitanza as Little Charlie Roos

Production
In the mid 1950s 20th Century Fox created a separate film company to make second features in CinemaScope initially called Regal Pictures, then Associated Producers Incorporated or API. Each of their features was shot in seven days in black and white with a budget of $100,000.  Unlike other B Picture producers, Regal and API maintained motion picture union standards of salaries and schedules.  With Fox's decreasing main feature production schedule, there was a fear that API would have to be disbanded as there were not enough main features to support (which eventually happened in the mid 1960s).

As an experiment, Robert Lippert told API producer Maury Dexter he wished to make films at half the budget and release them as double features in the manner of American International Pictures and Roger Corman's Filmgroup.

Dexter was skeptical, but made his directorial debut when he leapt to the challenge.  He completed the film at $50,000 on actual locations, including the house of Gary Cooper's mother.

Dexter said the film's title came from Lippert and Harry Spaulding had to write a script to suit it. It was Dexter's directorial debut.

References

External links 
 
The High Powered Rifle at TCMDB

1960 films
1960s English-language films
20th Century Fox films
American action films
1960s action films
Films directed by Maury Dexter
American black-and-white films
Films scored by Albert Glasser
1960 directorial debut films
1960s American films